Clube Desportivo Pinhalnovense is a Portuguese football club based in the town of Pinhal Novo, Palmela, Setúbal District. Founded in 1948, it currently plays in AF Setúbal 2ª Divisão, holding home games at Campo de Jogos Santos Jorge, with a 5,000-seat capacity.

The club's most high-profile player was former Portuguese international Jorge Cadete, who spent the 2004–05 season there before retiring.

League and cup history

2005: 1/8 final (lost 2–1 to CF Belenenses)
2007: 1/8 final (lost 6–0 to Sporting Portugal)
2010: 1/4 final (lost 3–1 to Naval 1 de Maio)

Managers
 2003–2006 :  Paco Fortes
 2006–2007 :  Rui Nascimento
 2007–2010 :  Paco Fortes
 2010– :  Paulo Fonseca

Current squad

Former players

External links
Zerozero team profile

 
Football clubs in Portugal
Association football clubs established in 1948
1948 establishments in Portugal